Salix myrsinifolia, known as the dark-leaved willow or myrsine-leaved willow, is a species of willow native to Europe and Western Siberia.

References

myrsinifolia